Tauschia arguta is a species of flowering plant in the carrot family known by the common name southern umbrellawort. It is native to the mountains of southern California and Baja California, where it grows in local habitat types such as woodlands and chaparral.

Description
Tauschia arguta is a perennial herb growing 30 to 70 centimeters tall. The leaves have blades which are divided into several toothed leaflets and borne on long petioles. The inflorescence is a compound umbel of yellow flowers with up to 25 rays measuring 2 to 12 centimeters long each. The fruit is almost a centimeter long and has deep longitudinal ribs.

References

External links
Jepson Manual Treatment — Tauschia arguta
Tauschia arguta Photo gallery

Apioideae
Flora of Baja California
Flora of California
Natural history of the California chaparral and woodlands
Natural history of the Channel Islands of California
Natural history of the Peninsular Ranges
Natural history of the Santa Monica Mountains
Natural history of the Transverse Ranges
Flora without expected TNC conservation status